Coast Miwok was one of the Miwok languages spoken in California, from San Francisco Bay to Bodega Bay. The Marin and Bodega varieties may have been separate languages. All of the population has shifted to English.

Grammar
According to Catherine A. Callaghan's Bodega Miwok Dictionary, nouns have the following cases, expressed with suffixes: present subjective, possessive, allative, locative, ablative, instrumental, and comitative. Sentences are most commonly subject-verb-object, but Callaghan says that "syntax is relatively free."

Phonology
The following is the Bodega dialect:

Phonemes in parentheses are introduced from Spanish loan words. Allophones of introduced sounds, /b ɡ/ include /β ɣ/.

References 

 Callaghan, Catherine A. 1970. Bodega Miwok Dictionary. Berkeley: University of California Press.
 Coast Miwok Indians. "Rodriguez-Nieto Guide" Sound Recordings (California Indian Library Collections), LA006. Berkeley: California Indian Library Collections, 1993. "Sound recordings reproduced from the Language Archive sound recordings at the Language Laboratory, University of California, Berkeley".
 Keeling, Richard. "Ethnographic Field Recordings at Lowie Museum of Anthropology," 1985. Robert H. Lowie Museum of Anthropology, University of California, Berkeley. v. 2. North-Central California: Pomo, Wintun, Nomlaki, Patwin, Coast Miwok, and Lake Miwok Indians

External links 
Coast Miwok at the Survey of California and Other Indian Languages
Coast Miwok, California Language Archive
OLAC resources in and about the Coast Miwok language
Coast (Bodega) Miwok basic lexicon at the Global Lexicostatistical Database

Miwok
Utian languages
Extinct languages of North America
History of the San Francisco Bay Area